The SMU Mustangs women's volleyball team is the NCAA Division I women's volleyball team at Southern Methodist University in Dallas. The program began its first season in 1996. Its current and only head coach is Lisa Seifert. Seifert led the program to its first American Athletic Conference title in 2015, posting a record of 27–6, setting a record for most wins in a season.

In SMU Volleyball's 2016 post-season, the Mustangs beat the Texas A&M Aggies in 3 straight sets(25-23,25-23,25-18) to advance to the second round of the NCAA tournament. This was the Mustangs second year to qualify for the tournament and first year to advance to the second round where they played the University of Texas Longhorns. SMU became the first American Athletic Conference Team to win an NCAA match after losing to Purdue in the first round of the NCAA tournament in 2015.

The 2019 season was another success. It resulted in a west-side AAC championship for the Mustangs. After winning their side of the conference, the Mustangs attended the AAC tournament when they were swept by UCF. Shortly after this season ended Covid-19 came into play. All volleyball operations were halted in March 2020 and the Mustangs didn’t practice for 5 months. Their 2020 fall season got postponed until the spring of 2021.

In 2020, Head Coach Lisa Seifert and the program celebrated her 25th year with the program.  She currently has over 421 wins, which is the second-most of any coach at SMU.

See also
List of NCAA Division I women's volleyball programs

References

Volleyball, Women's
College women's volleyball teams in the United States